Dickson Ruberth Morán Puelo  (born August 11, 1973 in Mérida) is a retired Venezuelan football striker.

Club career
Morán has played professional club football in a number of countries, including; Venezuela, Spain, Colombia, Argentina and Norway.

International career
He has played 65 times for the Venezuela national team scoring 15 goals, making him the 4th all-time top scorer in the history of Venezuelan international football.

International goals

Scores and results list Venezuela's goal tally first.

References

External links
 
 International statistics at rsssf
 Videos of Ruberth Morán

1973 births
Living people
Venezuelan footballers
Venezuela international footballers
1999 Copa América players
2004 Copa América players
Association football forwards
Estudiantes de Mérida players
Minervén S.C. players
Córdoba CF players
Deportivo Italia players
Deportivo Táchira F.C. players
UA Maracaibo players
Atlético Bucaramanga footballers
Argentinos Juniors footballers
Odds BK players
Cúcuta Deportivo footballers
Venezuelan Primera División players
Segunda División players
Categoría Primera A players
Argentine Primera División players
Venezuelan expatriate footballers
Expatriate footballers in Argentina
Expatriate footballers in Spain
Expatriate footballers in Norway
Expatriate footballers in Colombia
Venezuelan expatriate sportspeople in Argentina
Venezuelan expatriate sportspeople in Spain
Venezuelan expatriate sportspeople in Norway
Venezuelan expatriate sportspeople in Colombia
Venezuelan football managers
Deportivo Anzoátegui managers
People from Mérida, Mérida
Estudiantes de Mérida managers